Xətai may refer to:

 Xətai (Khatai), Ismail I, also known as Shah Ismail, Shah of Azerbaijan, Iran.
 Xətai raion, Azerbaijan
 Xətai, Agstafa, Azerbaijan
 Xətai, Nakhchivan, Azerbaijan